Richard Everett Dorr (August 26, 1943 – April 24, 2013) was a United States district judge of the United States District Court for the Western District of Missouri.

Education and career

Born in Jefferson City, Missouri, Dorr received a Bachelor of Science degree from the University of Illinois at Urbana–Champaign in 1965 and a Juris Doctor from the University of Missouri School of Law in Columbia, Missouri, in 1968. He was in the United States Air Force JAG Corps from 1968 to 1973, and continued to serve in that capacity as a reservist from 1974 to 1990. He was an assistant attorney general in the Missouri Attorney General's Office in 1968. He was in private practice in Springfield, Missouri, from 1973 to 2002.

District court service

On March 21, 2002, Dorr was nominated by President George W. Bush to a seat on the United States District Court for the Western District of Missouri vacated by D. Brook Bartlett. Dorr was confirmed by the United States Senate on August 1, 2002, and received his commission on August 2, 2002. On April 24, 2013, Dorr died from cancer in Houston, where he was being treated.

References

Sources

1943 births
2013 deaths
People from Jefferson City, Missouri
University of Illinois Urbana-Champaign alumni
Judges of the United States District Court for the Western District of Missouri
United States district court judges appointed by George W. Bush
21st-century American judges
University of Missouri School of Law alumni
United States Air Force officers
Deaths from cancer in Texas